The 2007 Nehru Cup International Football Tournament, also known as the ONGC Nehru Cup due to the competition's sponsorship by ONGC, was the 13th edition of the Nehru Cup a tournament organized by the All India Football Federation since 1982. It was the first Nehru Cup after a ten-year break from 1997 to 2007.

The tournament was played in the round-robin league format and the final was slated for 29 August in which India defeated Syria to claim its first title. Along with the host nation India, Cambodia, Bangladesh, Syria and Kyrgyzstan also competed in the 13-day tournament at the refurbished Ambedkar Stadium, where new floodlights had been put up specially for this tournament.

The total prize money of the tournament was $100,000. The champion team takes away a prize of $40,000, the runners-up receive $20,000 while the third place team will get $10,000. The winning team of every match received $2,500.

Discussion 
The Nehru Cup campaign started with an Indian 6–0 victory over the less experienced Cambodian side. India's Sunil Chhetri and Steven Dias had a great game, each of them netting twice. Baichung Bhutia had produced a wonderful performance in the match. Most of the game was played on the Cambodian side of the pitch. It was expected that India was going to take this one and they did with their second biggest recorded victory. Steven Dias was "Man of the match".

Syria started this tournament with a 2–0 victory over Bangladesh, followed by three consecutive wins over Kyrgyzstan, hosts India and Cambodia. The four wins saw Syria topping the round-roubin standings with a perfect record of 12 out of 12 points. They experienced Syrian side was led by their best goalscorers Zyad Chaabo, who scored 5 out of 14 goals for his team and Maher Al Sayed with four goals.

Hosts India, after beating Cambodia, enjoyed another win over neighbouring Bangladesh. After losing to Syria, the decisive game for the second final spot was held between the Indian team and Kyrgyzstan. India won that game 3–0 and advanced. The goals were scored by the Indian forwards Baichung Bhutia, Sunil Chhetri and Abhishek Yadav. This defeat saw the Central Asian side finishing third, while Bangladesh and Cambodia finished fourth and fifth place respectively having played a 1 all draw in their game.

The Nehru Cup final between India and Syria was held on 29 August 2007 in New Delhi. India defeated their opponents 1–0 thanks to a goal from N. P. Pradeep and won their first ever Nehru Cup trophy. The Indian team received 40,000 US-Dollar for winning this tournament.

All games of the tournament were broadcast live by Zee Sports.

Matches and results

Group stage 
Teams in green field progress to the Final.

Final

Winners

Statistics

Goalscorers

Man of the Match 
  Steven Dias (IND vs CAM)
  Maher Al Sayed BAN vs SYR
  Hok Sotitya (KGZ vs CAM)
  Subrata Pal (IND vs BAN)
  Maher Al Sayed (SYR vs KGZ)
  Mohammed Abul Hussain (BAN vs CAM)
  Zyad Chaabo (IND vs SYR)
  Hurshil Lutfullaev (BAN vs KGZ)
  Mahmoud Al Amenah (CAM vs SYR)
  Steven Dias (IND vs KGZ)
  Mahesh Gawli (IND vs SYR, Final)

References

External links 
 Details at kolkatafootball.com
 Details at RSSSF
 Details at futbolplanet.de
 Details at goalzz.com
 Details at indianfootball.com

2007
2007–08 in Indian football
2007–08 in Syrian football
2007 in Cambodian football
2007 in Kyrgyzstani football
2007 in Bangladeshi football
2007 in Asian football